Christian Eckert (born 8 February 1956 in Algrange, Moselle) is a former member of the National Assembly of France.  He represents the Meurthe-et-Moselle department, and is a member of the Socialiste, radical, citoyen et divers gauche.

References

1956 births
Living people
People from Algrange
Socialist Party (France) politicians
French Ministers of Budget
Deputies of the 13th National Assembly of the French Fifth Republic